The San Diego Gulls were a professional ice hockey team. The team, the second to use the Gulls nickname, was founded in 1990 as part of the International Hockey League. The Gulls played at the San Diego Sports Arena.

The team played five seasons, then relocated to Los Angeles, California in 1995 to become the Los Angeles Ice Dogs.  After one season in L.A., the team moved to Long Beach to become the Long Beach Ice Dogs and later would leave the IHL and join the WCHL (West Coast Hockey League). The Gulls were coached by Mike O'Connell (1990–91), Don Waddell (1991–92), Rick Dudley (1992–93), Harold Snepsts (1993–94), and Walt Kyle (1994–95).

In the 1992–93 season, the Gulls won the Fred A. Huber Trophy finishing first place overall in the regular season, setting an IHL record of 132 points earned as a team. The Gulls reached the Turner Cup finals, led by goaltender Clint Malarchuk, but were swept in four games by the Fort Wayne Komets.

Season-by-season results
Legend: OL=Overtime loss, Pct=Winning percentage

Former San Diego Gulls Players (IHL)      
  Craig Lugan
  Hubie McDonough
  Darin Banister
  Allan Bester
  Ron Duguay
  Dmitri Kvartalnov
  Glen Hanlon
  Charlie Simmer
  Ray Whitney
  Rick Knickle
  Steve Martinson
  Tony McKegney
  Clark Donatelli
  Steve Dykstra
  Jim McGeough
  Alain Chevrier
  Sean Burke
  Len Hachborn
  Jason Lafreniere
  Bruce Hoffort
  Daniel Shank
  Doug Smail 
  Lindy Ruff
  Denny Lambert
  Clint Malarchuk
  Don McSween

See also
 :Category:San Diego Gulls (IHL) players
 San Diego Gulls (1995–2006)

References

1990 establishments in California
1995 disestablishments in California
Defunct ice hockey teams in California
Ice hockey clubs established in 1990
Ice hockey teams in San Diego
Ice hockey teams in California
International Hockey League (1945–2001) teams
Sports clubs disestablished in 1995
Anaheim Ducks minor league affiliates